The Canton of Dun-sur-Auron is a canton situated in the Cher département and in the Centre-Val de Loire region of France.

Geography 
A farming area in the valley of the river Auron, in the northern part of the arrondissement of Saint-Amand-Montrond centred on the town of Dun-sur-Auron. The altitude varies from 142m at Saint-Denis-de-Palin to 249m at Chalivoy-Milon, with an average altitude of 174m.

Composition 
At the French canton reorganisation which came into effect in March 2015, the canton was expanded from 12 to 32 communes:
 
Arpheuilles
Augy-sur-Aubois
Bannegon
Bessais-le-Fromental
Bussy
Chalivoy-Milon
Charenton-du-Cher
Chaumont
Cogny
Contres
Coust
Dun-sur-Auron
Givardon
Grossouvre
Lantan
Mornay-sur-Allier
Neuilly-en-Dun
Neuvy-le-Barrois
Osmery
Parnay
Le Pondy
Raymond
Sagonne
Saint-Aignan-des-Noyers
Saint-Denis-de-Palin
Saint-Germain-des-Bois
Saint-Pierre-les-Étieux
Sancoins
Thaumiers
Vereaux
Vernais
Verneuil

Population

See also 
 Arrondissements of the Cher department
 Cantons of the Cher department
 Communes of the Cher department

References

Dun-sur-Auron